The Second Magdalena massacre was an attack by Apaches against the Spanish mission village of Magdalena de Kino, in the present day northern Mexico. The attack occurred sometime in mid November 1776, most or all of Magdalena de Kino's inhabitants were killed so an exact date will never be known.

Massacre

It was the second massacre on the town, in November 1757, Seri natives attacked and killed thirty-one civilians. Captain Francisco Ignacio de Trespalacios, who replaced the fallen commander, Francisco Tovar, after the First Battle of Terrenate, discovered the massacred colonists during a campaign from Presidio Santa Cruz de Terrenate with eighty-three cavalry men. The Spanish Army found that around forty Apaches had looted the settlement, murdered the inhabitants and burned the church.

See also

Capture of Tucson (1846)
Capture of Tucson (1862)
American Indian Wars
Apache Wars
Navajo Wars

References

 Bancroft, Hubert Howe, 1888, History of Arizona and New Mexico, 1530–1888. The History Company, San Francisco.  
 Cooper, Evelyn S., 1995, Tucson in Focus: The Buehman Studio. Arizona Historical Society, Tucson..
 Dobyns, Henry F., 1976, Spanish Colonial Tucson. University of Arizona Press, Tucson.. 
 Drachman, Roy P., 1999, From Cowtown to Desert Metropolis: Ninety Years of Arizona Memories. Whitewing Press, San Francisco. (.

History of Mexico
1776 in the Spanish Empire
Massacres by Native Americans
Magdalena de Kino
Conflicts in 1776
Apache–Mexico Wars